Abu 'l-Asakir Jaysh ibn Khumarawayh (born c. 882) was the third Emir of the Tulunids in Egypt, ruling briefly in 896. The eldest son of Khumarawayh ibn Ahmad ibn Tulun, he succeeded him early in 896 at the age of fourteen. Soon afterwards he ordered the execution of his uncle Mudar ibn Ahmad ibn Tulun. After ruling for only a few months, the faqihs and qadis declared him deposed and he was killed in November 896, along with his vizier Ali ibn Ahmad al-Madhara'i. He was replaced by his younger brother Harun.

880s births
896 deaths
9th-century Tulunid emirs
Tulunid emirs
Year of birth uncertain
Executed monarchs